The Inspector General of Police (IGP) is the professional head of the Sri Lanka Police. They are the most senior police officer in Sri Lanka and oversees all police personnel throughout the country. The IGP reports to the Minister of Law and Order, when the Police Service is under the Ministry of Law and Order as it is currently.

History
The post of Inspector General of Police in Sri Lanka can be traced as far back as 1797 when the office of Fiscal was created and Fredric Barron Mylius was appointed as Fiscal of Colombo and entrusted with responsibility of policing the City of Colombo. In 1833, the Head of the Police Service was called the Superintendent of Police, in 1836 the designation was changed to Chief Superintendent of Police.

The official establishment of the Ceylon Police Force was on 3 September 1866 when William Robert Campbell (then the chief of police in the Indian province of Rathnageri) was appointed as Chief Superintendent of Police in Ceylon to be in charge of the Police units. This post officially  became the Chief of Police but was soon changed to that of the Inspector General of Police accordingly William Robert Campbell became the first Inspector General of Police.

The current Inspector General of Police is Pujith Jayasundara, who succeeded N. K. Illangakoon in April 2016. Jayasundara was asked to resign by President Maithripala Sirisena, but has refused and has been put on compulsory leave in the wake of the 2019 Sri Lanka Easter bombings debacle, Senior DIG C. D. Wickramaratne has been appointed as acting Inspector General.

Removal
The Inspector General of Police can be removed through an investigation by a 3-member committee if found guilty of specified offence(s) under the Removal of Officers (Procedure) Act No. 5 of 2002.

Inspectors General of Police

See also
Inspector-General of Police
Sri Lanka Police
Special Task Force
Ministry of Defence

Notes

References

External links
 Official Police Website

 
Police ranks of Sri Lanka